Jerry "The Bear" Penrod (born September 25, 1946 in San Diego, California) is a bass player. He was a member of Iron Butterfly and Rhinoceros. In addition to playing bass with Iron Butterfly, he contributed one of the lead vocals on their song "Look for the Sun".

References 

Musicians from San Diego
1946 births
Living people
Iron Butterfly members
Guitarists from California
American male bass guitarists
20th-century American bass guitarists
20th-century American male musicians
Rhinoceros (band) members